The 2014–15 Syracuse Orange women's basketball team will represent Syracuse University during the 2014–15 college basketball season. Quentin Hillsman resumes the responsibility as head coach for an eighth consecutive season. The Orange were second year members of the Atlantic Coast Conference and play their home games at the Carrier Dome. They finished the season 22–10, 11–5 in ACC play to finish in a tie for fourth place. They lost in the second round of the ACC women's tournament to Wake Forest. They received an at-large bid of the NCAA women's tournament where they defeated Nebraska in the first round before losing to South Carolina in the second round.

2014–15 media

Syracuse IMG Sports Network
The Syracuse Orange IMG Sports Network will broadcast all Orange games on WTLA ESPN Radio 97.7/100.1 FM & 1200 AM with Brian Higgins on the call. The games will also be streamed online at Cuse.com. The Orange can also be followed on social media: Twitter @CuseWBB and Facebook /SyracuseWBB.

2014–15 Roster

Schedule

|-
!colspan=9 style="background:#D44500; color:#212B6D;"|Regular Season

|-
!colspan=9 style="background:#212B6D;"| 2015 ACC Tournament

|-
!colspan=9 style="background:#212B6D;"| NCAA Women's Tournament

Rankings
2014–15 NCAA Division I women's basketball rankings

See also
 Syracuse Orange women's basketball
 2014–15 Syracuse Orange men's basketball team

References

Syracuse Orange women's basketball seasons
Syracuse
Syracuse
Syracuse Orange
Syracuse Orange